OSN Ya Hala is a pan-Arab Arabic language television network owned by Orbit Showtime Network (OSN). Programming includes talk shows, reality shows, lifestyle shows, dramas and comedies.

OSN Ya Hala International 

In Canada, OSN Ya Hala is an Exempted Category B service operated by the Toronto-based Ethnic Channels Group (ECG). It has the same programming as the Middle Eastern/North African channel, as well as specific Canadian content. It is available in SDTV format via Rogers Cable, Cogeco and Bell Fibe TV.

It was originally launched as Dream 1 but was subsequently re-branded as OSN Ya Hala International in August 2015.

Programming 
 Hindistani
 Kurtlar Vadisi
 Muhteşem Yüzyıl

References

External links 
 Official website of OSN Ya Hala International Canada

Digital cable television networks in Canada
Television channels and stations established in 2011
Arabic-language television in Canada